Guyim (also Romanized as Gūyīm; also known as Gūyom and Gūyum) is a village in Derak Rural District, in the Central District of Shiraz County, Fars Province, Iran. At the 2006 census, its population was 7,297, in 1,829 families.

See also

Ardashir-Khwarrah

References 

Populated places in Shiraz County